Gap View Farm, near Charles Town, West Virginia, is a historic farm complex built in 1774.  The farm was placed on the National Register of Historic Places on January 9, 1997.

Origin of name
The property gets its name from its view of the gap in the Blue Ridge made by the Potomac River at Harpers Ferry.

History
Walter Baker came to then, Berkeley County, Virginia, in 1770 and began clearing the property.  A small limestone house was built by Baker in 1750, on property that was granted to Henry Lloyd by Thomas Fairfax, 6th Lord Fairfax of Cameron.  The main house of the farm was built by Baker in 1774.  At Baker's death in 1820, the property was sold by Baker's widow, Jacobina, to James L. Ranson.  When Ranson fell on hard times, he sold it to Parker Strode in 1868.  In 1871, the property was acquired by Charles Aglionby, who owned the adjoining Mount Pleasant estate and a portion of Media Farm.  Over time the house was expanded in four phases.  In 1937, the farm was again sold to a family by the name of Barlett.

In 1954, the farm was purchased by World War I veteran Frank Buckles and his wife Audrey (who died in 1999).  Their daughter Susannah was born there in 1955, and she returned to live there after her mother's death.  Buckles would ultimately become the last American survivor of World War I, and lived there until his death on February 27, 2011, at the age of 110.

On January 9, 1997, the farm and property were placed on the National Register of Historic Places.

Description
Gap view is a two-story three-bay brick house, with prominent stepped parapets at the gable ends. As originally built, it was arranged with a side hall plan, that was later changed to a center hall arrangement.

Conservation
Susannah Mayo Buckles, daughter of Frank Buckles, runs the day-to-day operations of the farm and has made the farm more eco-friendly.  In May 2008, volunteers planted over 1,000 trees and shrubs on the farm.

Many local agencies have worked to plant trees and shrubs, as well as wetland species of trees and shrubs, along the property's stream and wetland areas.

Ms. Buckles also installed 15,000 feet of fencing as part land retirement program called the Conservation Reserve Enhancement Program.  The fencing separated the farm's conservation areas from the farm's other residents, 130 head of cattle.

In July 2009, it was announced that the farm was in the running for the West Virginia Conservation Farmer of the Year, though it is unclear if the farm won.  The farm had won Jefferson County Conservation Farmer of the Year in 2009.

References

External links

Colonial Revival architecture in West Virginia
Colonial architecture in West Virginia
Farms on the National Register of Historic Places in West Virginia
Georgian architecture in West Virginia
Historic American Buildings Survey in West Virginia
Historic districts in Jefferson County, West Virginia
Historic districts on the National Register of Historic Places in West Virginia
Houses completed in 1774
Houses in Jefferson County, West Virginia
Houses on the National Register of Historic Places in West Virginia
National Register of Historic Places in Jefferson County, West Virginia